The Davao River is the third largest river by drainage basin on the southern Philippines in the island of Mindanao. Most of the area is uplands. The climate type is relatively uniform throughout the year with evenly distributed rainfall and temperatures and humidity (rainfall = 2600mm, Actual Evap 1028mm). The area rarely experiences typhoons.

Stats
 River Length: 
 Maximum Elevation: 
 Rainfall Average: Mean annual rainfall is 1800mm. Rainfall is evenly distributed throughout the year.

Topography/Soil Type
Plains and Valley: Parent Material:
 San Maguel Silty Clay Loam: Alluvium of igneous
 Matina Clay Loam : Alluvium from limestone, shale and sandstones

Intermediate Upland:
 Tugbok Clay: Igneous rock Andesites
 Faraon Clay: Soft Coralline limestone
 Cabantain Clay: Soft shales with mix of weathered gravels and pebbles

Hills and Mountains:
 Camansa sandy clay loam: Shale and sandstone with weathered gravel and sand
 Mountain Soils: undifferentiated : Various igneous and metamorphic rock

Demographic properties
 DRW Population: ~ 800,000
 Average per capita income: 144,039 per family per annum (2000 National average)
 Industrial and agricultural gross domestic product: 64.1 Billion Peso for Region XI
 Population Below Poverty Line: 45% in rural areas ; 27% in urban areas (for southern Mindanao)
 Water Poverty Index parameters: Medium (WPI 56-61.9).

Land uses
The landform and landcover within the basin is highly diverse. Ranging from lowland urban, agricultural, wetland and mangrove to natural riparian, plantations, upland agriculture and mountainous forest including primary forest. The area is classified by DENR as 77.5% forestlands and 22.5% alienable and disposable land. This is not a true land uses (or land cover) classification. Detailed land use is not available. Information is available from several sources including the Comprehensive Land Use Plan of the City, however this data is as yet theoretical and does not represent the realities or suitability of land at the barangay (lowest tier of local government) level. However the City Planning Office is collecting and digitizing data for land use maps.

Water resources and uses in the basin

River discharge measurements taken from 1984 to 1990 indicated an average river flow of approximately 78 cubic meters per second for the period.

The main drinking water sources for Davao City are in the neighboring Talomo watershed. These sources are under pressure and the Davao River Basin is likely to be required for water abstraction in the near future.

The Environmental Management Bureau samples 8 sites from the confluence of the Tamugan river downstream to the mouth of the river. From the Tamugan River confluence with the Davao River down stream to DDF Subdivision, Mandug the water is classified as Class A – Public Water Supply Class II. Downstream of this point to the sea is classified as Class B or recreational water class I. Analyses for dissolved oxygen over the past 4 years has indicated no significant change in quality. The current monitoring of water quality is insufficient to monitor and evaluate pollution levels and trends in the river.

References

 D Hearne, crs, proposal to HELP UNESCO, 2004

External links

 Basin Properties
 " Pictures

 Davao Water Partnership 

Rivers of the Philippines
Landforms of Davao del Sur
Landforms of Bukidnon